Karl Kenneth Odani Bono (born June 19, 1984) is a Filipino basketball player who last played for the TNT KaTropa of the Philippine Basketball Association (PBA). He played collegiate basketball for the Adamson Soaring Falcons in the University Athletic Association of the Philippines (UAAP) from 2003 to 2006 and was named the league's Most Valuable Player in his final season before being selected sixth overall by the Alaska Aces in the 2007 PBA draft.

In the Philippine Basketball League (PBL), Bono played for Montaña Pawnshop and Cebuana Lhuillier. In his last conference in the PBL, he was the MVP frontrunner but lost the award to Jayson Castro of Harbour Centre due to lack of media votes. He also played for the Bangkok Cobras in the ASEAN Basketball League.

Achievements

University Athletic Association of the Philippines (UAAP)
 2006 Most Valuable Player
 2006 Mythical First Team

Philippine Basketball League (PBL)
 2006 Most Improved Player
 2006 Mythical Second Team 
 2007 Sportsmanship Award
 2007 Mythical First Team

Philippine Basketball Association (PBA)
 2009 PBA Fiesta Conference champion (with San Miguel Beermen)
 2013 PBA Governors' Cup champion (with San Mig Coffee Mixers)

Philippine Sportswriters Association
 2006 Amateur Player of the Year

PBA career statistics

Correct as of October 19, 2016

Season-by-season averages

|-
| align=left | 
| align=left | Alaska / Magnolia
| 29 || 8.5 || .466 || .538 || .727 || 2.3 || .4 || .0 || .1 || 3.8
|-
| align=left | 
| align=left | San Miguel
| 24 || 8.2 || .402 || .250 || .667 || 2.2 || .2 || .1 || .2 || 3.5
|-
| align=left | 
| align=left | Coca-Cola
| 24 || 8.7 || .338 || .100 || .800 || 2.4 || .4 || .1 || .0 || 2.8
|-
| align=left | 
| align=left | Barako Bull
| 8 || 14.5 || .370 || 1.000 || .750 || 3.8 || .5 || .3 || .1 || 5.5
|-
| align=left | 
| align=left | B-Meg
| 3 || 1.7 || .000 || .000 || .000 || 1.2 || .2 || .0 || .0 || 3.0
|-
| align=left | 
| align=left | Meralco
| 18 || 6.5 || .342 || .000 || 1.000 || 1.1 || .5 || .0 || .0 || 1.8
|-class=sortbottom
| align=center colspan=2 | Career
| 106 || 8.4 || .391 || .311 || .758 || 2.2 || .4 || .1 || .1 || 3.2

Personal life
Bono is the son of an American ex-marine Anthony Shannon and Maria Nonie Bono of Iloilo City. He is married and a father of one.

References

1984 births
Living people
Alaska Aces (PBA) players
Barako Bull Energy Boosters players
Basketball players from Iloilo
Centers (basketball)
Filipino men's basketball players
Filipino people of American descent
Meralco Bolts players
Power forwards (basketball)
Powerade Tigers players
San Miguel Beermen players
Sportspeople from Iloilo City
Magnolia Hotshots players
Adamson Soaring Falcons basketball players
Visayan people
Alaska Aces (PBA) draft picks
Filipino men's 3x3 basketball players
PBA 3x3 players